The Mirage 27 (Perry) is a Canadian sailboat, designed by American Robert Perry and first built in 1982. The design is out of production.

Production
The boat was built by Mirage Yachts in Canada. It is not related to the Mirage 27 designed by Peter Schmidt, another design built by Mirage under the same name.

Design

The Mirage 27 is a small recreational keelboat, built predominantly of fibreglass. It has a masthead sloop rig, an internally-mounted spade-type rudder and a fixed fin keel.

The boat is a derivative of the Perry-designed Mirage 26, modified with a reverse transom and a spade-type rudder. This design replaced the Mirage 26 in the company line.

Operational history
In a review Michael McGoldrick wrote, "these are good looking boats with a sensible and comfortable interior. The Mirage 26 was the first of these two models to be built. It had a quasi transom mounted rudder (there is small cutout in the transom to accommodate the rudder). Because of its longer waterline, the Mirage 27 is the faster of the two boats."

See also
List of sailing boat types

Similar sailboats
Aloha 27
Cal 27
Cal 2-27
Cal 3-27
Catalina 27
Catalina 270
Catalina 275 Sport
C&C 27
Crown 28
CS 27
Edel 820
Express 27
Fantasia 27
Halman Horizon
Hotfoot 27
Hullmaster 27
Hunter 27
Hunter 27-2
Hunter 27-3
Irwin 27 
Island Packet 27
Mirage 27 (Schmidt)
Mirage 275
O'Day 272
Orion 27-2
Watkins 27
Watkins 27P

References

External links

Keelboats
1980s sailboat type designs
Sailing yachts
Sailboat type designs by Robert Perry
Sailboat types built by Mirage Yachts